The men's pole vault event at the 1928 Olympic Games took place on August 1. Twenty athletes from thirteen nations competed. The maximum number of athletes per nation was four. The event was won by Sabin Carr of the United States, for the nation's eighth consecutive victory in the men's pole vault. Americans William Droegemuller and Charles McGinnis won silver and bronze respectively, giving Team USA their second consecutive and third overall medal sweep in the Olympic pole vault event.

Background

This was the eighth appearance of the event, which is one of 12 athletics events to have been held at every Summer Olympics. The returning finalists from the 1924 Games were gold medalist Lee Barnes of the United States, fifth-place finisher Victor Pickard of Canada, and seventh-place finisher Maurice Henrijean of Belgium. Sabin Carr of the United States had been the first to break 14 feet, in 1927, but Barnes had broken Carr's record in 1928 and was favored to repeat.

Japan and Spain each made their first appearance in the event. The United States made its eighth appearance, the only nation to have competed at every Olympic men's pole vault to that point.

Competition format

The competition continued to use the two-round format introduced in 1912, with results cleared between rounds. Vaulters received three attempts at each height.

In the qualifying round, the bar was set at 3.30 metres, 3.50 metres, and 3.66 metres. All vaulters clearing 3.66 metres advanced to the final.

In the final, the bar was set at 3.50 metres, 3.65 metres, 3.80 metres, 3.90 metres, and then increased by 5 centimetres at a time.

Records

These were the standing world and Olympic records (in metres) prior to the 1928 Summer Olympics.

Sabin Carr and William Droegemuller both succeeded at 4.10 metres, breaking the Olympic record. Carr was able to extent the new record to 4.20 metres.

Schedule

Results

Qualifying round

All athletes clearing 3.66 metres advanced to the final. Jump sequences are not known.

Final

There was a jump-off for third place between McGinnis, Pickard, and Barnes, who had all achieved 3.95 metres but not 4.00 metres. In the jump-off, McGinnis was the only one to succeed at 4.10 metres, so he received the bronze medal. Pickard was able to repeat at 3.95 metres, while Barnes was not, so Pickard took fourth place and Barnes took fifth place.

References

Men's pole vault
Pole vault at the Olympics
Men's events at the 1928 Summer Olympics